Manino is a rural locality (a selo) and the administrative center of Maninskoye Rural Settlement, Kalacheyevsky District, Voronezh Oblast, Russia. The population was 2,409 as of 2010. There are 32 streets.

Geography 
Manino is located 31 km northeast of Kalach (the district's administrative centre) by road. Krasnopolye is the nearest rural locality.

References 

Rural localities in Kalacheyevsky District